Link Top is a locality of Malvern Link, a major population area of the town of Malvern, Worcestershire, England.  It is situated at the western extremity of Malvern Link at its boundary  with  Great Malvern and North Malvern.  It is centred on a sharp  left hand bend in  the  Worcester Road (A449) that  forms a complex junction  with  the North Malvern Road,  Hornyold Road, Newtown Road, and Lygon Bank,

The main shopping area of Link Top stretches along the Worcester Road and Newtown Road and contains most  of the retail outlets and amenities common to a village including pharmacies, dry goods stores, electrical  and TV shops, hairdressers, hardware stores,  fast-food,  a post  office, and a number of pubs. The centre of the area is dominated by  the Church  of the Holy Trinity (Anglican), the parish  church  of North Malvern, built  in  1851 and its large parish  hall.

Notable people
Haile Selassie, Emperor of Ethiopia, lived in Malvern for a while after being forced out of Ethiopia by the Italian invasion in the late 1930s. During this time he attended services at Holy Trinity Church.

Transport

Rail
Malvern Link railway station is located in Worcester Road near the centre of Malvern Link and provides direct services to Worcester, Hereford, Gloucester, Birmingham, Oxford and London Paddington.

Bus
Several local bus services connect Link Top with the surrounding area  including the 42, S42 operated by Astons Coaches stopping in Barnards Green bus shelter. Serving  areas further afield are: 
the  Malvern to  Worcester route 44, 44A, 44B operated by First Midland Red serving stops at the Barnards Green bus shelter and Pound Bank; The Worcester -  Upton-upon-Severn - Malvern route 362/363 operated by Diamond West Midlands serves that stops at  the Barnards Green bus shelter  and the Malvern - Gloucester - Cheltenham route 377 (Saturdays only) operated by Diamond West Midlands, stopping at the Court Road shops and the Barnards Green bus shelter.

Air
The nearest major airport is Birmingham Airport approximately one hour by road via the M5 and M42 motorways. Gloucestershire Airport located at Staverton, in the Borough of Tewkesbury near Malvern is a busy General Aviation airport used mainly for private charter and scheduled flights to destinations such as the islands of Jersey, Guernsey, and the Isle of Man, pilot training, and by the aircraft of emergency services.

References

External links 
Vision of Britain

Geography of Worcestershire